Senecan tragedy refers to a set of ten ancient Roman tragedies, probably eight of which were written by the Stoic philosopher and politician Lucius Annaeus Seneca.

Senecan Tragedies

The group comprises:
 Hercules Furens 
 Medea 
 Troades 
 Phaedra 
 Agamemnon 
 Oedipus 
 Phoenissae 
 Thyestes 
 Hercules Oetaeus 
 Octavia

Hercules Oetaeus is generally considered not to have been written by Seneca, and Octavia is certainly not. 

Many of the Senecan tragedies employ the same Greek myths as tragedies by Sophocles, Aeschylus, and Euripides; but scholars tend not to view Seneca's works as direct adaptations of those Attic works, as Seneca's approach differs, and he employs themes familiar from his philosophical writings. It is possible that the style was more directly influenced by Augustan literature. Moreover, Seneca's tragedies were probably written to be recited at elite gatherings, due to their extensive narrative accounts of action, dwelling on reports of horrible deeds, and employing long reflective soliloquies.

Usually, the Senecan tragedy focuses heavily on supernatural elements. The gods rarely appear, but ghosts and witches abound.

Reception

In the mid-16th century, Italian humanists rediscovered these works, making them models for the revival of tragedy on the Renaissance stage. The two great, but very different, dramatic traditions of the age—French neoclassical tragedy and Elizabethan tragedy—both drew inspiration from Seneca. 

The Elizabethan dramatists found Seneca's themes of bloodthirsty revenge more congenial to English taste than they did his form. The first English tragedy, Gorboduc (1561), by Thomas Sackville and Thomas Norton, is a chain of slaughter and revenge written in direct imitation of Seneca. (As it happens, Gorboduc does follow the form as well as the subject matter of Senecan tragedy: but only a very few other English plays—e.g. The Misfortunes of Arthur—followed its lead in this.) Senecan influence is also evident in Thomas Kyd's The Spanish Tragedy, and in Shakespeare's Titus Andronicus and Hamlet. All three share a revenge theme, a corpse-strewn climax, and The Spanish Tragedy and Hamlet also have ghosts among the cast; all of these elements can be traced back to the Senecan model.

French neoclassical dramatic tradition, which reached its highest expression in the 17th-century tragedies of Pierre Corneille and Jean Racine, drew on Seneca for form and grandeur of style. These neoclassicists adopted Seneca's innovation of the confidant (usually a servant), his substitution of speech for action, and his moral hairsplitting.

See also
Theatre of ancient Rome

References

Drama
Tragedies (dramas)
Seneca the Younger